Star Singer is an Indian music reality-television competition, broadcast on Asianet and previously sponsored by Idea Cellular.  The show, which selected contestants in the age group of 15–35 years determined the winner based on their skill in singing and entertainment. From Season 1 to 7, Text messages are sent by the shows' audience to vote for the best performing participant and a small weightage of this score is considered for a candidate to be shortlisted to next round. Season 8 onwards voting is conducted on Disney+ Hotstar, Star Network's official OTT platform. The show also features a panel of judges who are prominent personalities in the Malayalam music industry and they offer scores and evaluations of performance to the contestants in every stage of the competition. In 2009 , Star singer junior was launched.

History

2006
Starting out in 2006 along the lines of Indian Idol, the chief judge on the show was Malayalam music director M. Jayachandran accompanied by a panel of veteran musicians like K. S. Chithra, M. G. Radhakrishnan, Tippu, Deepak Dev, Jassie Gift, Chitra Iyer, Sugeetha Menon and many other pioneers from the music industry. The show was co-hosted by singers Vidhu Prathap, Biju Narayanan, Rimi Tomy and Joy John Antony. Out of approximately 7,000 contestants participating from various states of the country the season was won by Arun Raj in the male category and Kavita Jayaram in the female category. The winners received Rs. 100,000 in prize money, a contract for playback assignments in Jayachandran's upcoming film projects, a deal with Satyam Audios and deals for performing at concerts abroad. This season of the show was produced by Prathap Nair.

2007
In 2007, Idea Star Singer returned with an improved show format and was hosted by Ranjini Haridas, a winner of the Miss Kerala pageant. In this season, the prize was an opportunity to sing in the next project by film director Vinayan, and an apartment in Cochin worth Rs .  The judging panel featured playback singer M. G. Sreekumar, music director Sharath, and Indian pop singer Usha Uthup. A fourth judging spot featured different celebrity guests all of whom are people of importance in the Malayalam film industry.  The 2007 season was inaugurated by popular Malayali actor Mohanlal and more than 20,000 hopeful singers applied to participate in this season. Only 45 contestants were short-listed from the 100 contestants that made it through to the preliminary round, and this was followed by a televised elimination round based on audience's text message votes and the decision of the judging panel.  During the season, contestants were involved in special grooming and choreography sessions.

The final round of the competition was held on 19 April 2008 and the final votes via text messages were close to 500,000. Najim Arshad from Thiruvananthapuram won the final round, winning the brand new flat which was sponsored by The Confident Group. The first runner-up was Durga Viswanath and she got a Ford Fiesta car sponsored by The Alukkas Jewellery Group. The second runner-up was Thushar M K and the third runner-up was Arun Gopan

2008
This season of Idea Star Singer was flagged off by Malayalam action hero Suresh Gopi, who also performed a song, along with performances by M.G. Sreekumar, Ouseppachan, P. Unnikrishnan, and L.R. Eswari. The inaugural episode started with a prayer and song by Najim Arshad, who won the previous season of the show.
 
85 contestants competed in the auditions round, out of which only 50 contestants were selected.  In this season, two prizes were awarded, one each for a male and female contestant. The prize was an apartment either Thiruvananthapuram or Dubai City, each valued at Rupees 1million sponsored by the Confident Group. The main panel of judges was changed to introduce Ouseppachan, P. Unnikrishnan and a spot for a different celebrity guest judge for each week. At the start of the season M.G. Sreekumar who was a judge in the previous season was retained in the main panel of judges, but he was later removed, and Sharreth and Usha Uthup from the previous season were called back upon popular demand. The show was initially hosted by Ramya Raveendran but Ranjini Haridas returned to host the show under popular demand from the viewers, and this led to Ranjini becoming an iconic part of the show in its future seasons.

The final round of this season was aired live on 25 April 2009 from the Chandrashekaran Nair Stadium, Trivandrum and it was hosted by Ranjini Haridas and Meera Nandan (a contestant from the 2007 season) a held at The special chief guest for the finale was Music Director MS Viswanathan. The 2008 season was won by Vivek Anand  and
Sonia Aamod in the male and female winner categories respectively. The first runner-up was Rahul R Laxman and he was presented with 101 tolas of gold sponsored by Josco Jewellers. The fourth prize of Rs. 200,000 went to Gayathri. Consolation prizes were given to Jins Gopinath and Prasobh.

2009
Idea Star Singer returned on air for its fourth season in 2009. The judging panel the season was K.S Chithra, M.G. Sreekumar and Sharreth. The season was hosted by anchor and winner of Miss Kerala, Ranjini Haridas. The season was won by Joby John and Sreenath Nair, Preethi Varrier, Anju Joseph and Vidyashankar was the runners-up of the season.

The grand finale was held at Chandrashekaran Nair Stadium at Thiruvananthapuram on 1 August 2010. S.P.Balasubramanyam, M.G. Sreekumar, K.S.Chithra and Sarath were the judges of the grand finale. The finalists was Preethi Varrier, Sreenath Nair, Anju Joseph, Joby John and Vidyashankar. Joby John was declared as the winner of the season and was awarded a villa of 10 million by Travancore Builders. Joby was the most popular among the contestants and attained 50 million SMS votes from the people. Sreenath Nair was declared as the first runner up of the season with 30 million SMS votes. Preethi Varrier, Anju Joseph and Vidyashankar was the second, third and fourth runners-up of the season respectively.

2010
Kalpana Raghavendar won the 2010 Star Singer contest. She won a villa worth INR 10,000,000. Mridula Varier became the first runner-up. She won gold worth INR 1,500,000. Immanuel Henry became the second runner-up. He won gold worth INR 750,000. Antony John became the third runner-up. He won INR 500,000. Akhil Krishnan became the fourth runner-up. He won INR 200,000. Antony also won a special prize of INR 500,000 from film actor Mohanlal but due to shooting and other problems, Mohanlal wasn't able to turn up leaving Ganagandharvan Padma Shri Dr K.J Yesudas to hand over the prize money.

2011–2012
Idea Star Singer season 6 Grand Finale held at Trivandrum on 22 December 2012. Merin Gregory of Kozhikode won the ISS winner title in ISS season 6. The second prize was secured by Rajiv Rajasekharan from Thiruvananthapuram.  The eminent judging panel consisted of playback singers Hariharan, K. S. Chithra, M. G. Sreekumar, Anuradha Sreeram and music director M. Jayachandran. The finalists were Sukesh Kuttan from Dubai, Megha Sijimon from Kochi, Nandu Kishore from Pala and Shamshad from Attingal. The show was Produced by Asianet and Directed by Prathap Nair.

2014
The seventh season of Star Singer started airing in March 2014. The show was hosted by Rimi Tomy and M. G. Sreekumar, who were also the judges, along with Anuradha Sriram. The title winner of Sunfeast Delishus Star Singer was Malavika Anilkumar from Thrissur, Kanimangalam.She has won many competitions other than Idea Star Singer. She won a flat in Kochi worth Rupees 5 million from Confident Group run by Dr. C. J. Roy; followed by Reshma Raghavendra, Aslam Abdul Majid at second and third position respectively.

2020-2022
The eighth season was launched on 27 December 2020.The show was hosted by Jewel Mary. The launch event was telecasted on 3 January 2021. Due to the COVID-19 Pandemic, the show was put on hold after 43 episodes in July 2021 and relaunched with a mega event on 02 Jan 2022.The show ended on 19 June 2022 and the title winner is Ridhu Krishna. He won a flat worth Rupees 1 crore from Confident Group run by Dr. C. J. Roy.

2022-2023
The third season of juniors was launched on 30 October 2022 after a hiatus of 10 years.The show was hosted by Jewel Mary and Akhil Kutty.Previous season's chief jury Sujatha Mohan launched the show. The winner of the show was Pallavi Ratheesh who won 30 lakhs.

Key people

 Junior

Controversies

SMS
Asianet has not made clear how the SMS votes are attributed before and after on each contestants reaching the 'danger zone' leading to their elimination. It is alleged that the SMS votes received are not added to decide the ranking of the contestants. The number or the percentage of SMS votes received by each contestants are kept private from the viewers of the show. Since the channel has its reach over 60 countries including the Indian sub-continent, Sri Lanka, China, South East Asia, Middle East, Europe, United States, Singapore and the lower half of the former Soviet Union at various time zones, the SMS voting end-time was initially not announced. Asianet later clarified after the eighth stage that SMS voting deadlines are based on Indian Time.

According to Asianet sources, for the Grand Finale, weightage of SMS was just 5% of overall score with judges' score attributing the rest 95%.

Elimination round
After each stage of performance, the show has 'elimination' round. The candidates are eliminated from the next stage of performance through the 'elimination' round. Candidates are eliminated based on the scores given by the judges and the SMS votes each candidates gets. The number of SMS votes each candidate gets is not revealed to the audience. Initially the audience were not informed of the elimination date and venue in advance. However, the channel pursued its audience to vote even after the elimination process was over. This had affected the reputation of the channel and the programme was criticized for its malpractices. However, after its eighth stage the project team behind the programme corrected this error as a face saving measure by making its elimination round public. The programme continued to be criticized through the online forum of the programme itself. Later, Asianet had to close the forum fearing negative opinions.

Every elimination round begins with the presentation of a few candidates as fallen into danger zone. A candidate falls into danger zone if the channel declares that person has not got either sufficient scores or enough votes. The elimination round is always presented as an emotional event where often the judges and participants end up crying. Often the judges use the emotional environment to persuade the audience to vote.

Prizes 
There are criticism from various corners saying that many of the winners didn't actually opt to receive the prizes because of the huge tax they had to pay for receiving the villa. That means the channel's advertisement of getting a villa through their sponsor is questioned. This got more visible in the case of ISS season 4 winner Joby John

Asianet's exclusivity rights on ISS contestants
The show appears to have lost some credibility when one of the contestants was eliminated without being present at the stage on the eighth round of eliminations. The reason behind this contestants deliberate absence remains unexplained to the audience and was told to be due to 'personal reasons' and 'not so serious matter' concerning him, the show & Asianet. They have confirmed that he was eliminated from show for violating one of the rules. There is a rumor that the contestant got booted off the show after he declined from signing the exclusivity rights contract with Asianet not to sing in movies, attend stage shows, or other television channel's programs for a period of 18 months.

References and notes

External links
Season 8 Auditions Started
Asianet site
Idea Star Singer Season 7
Idea Star Singer Season 6

2000s Indian television series
Asianet (TV channel) original programming
Malayalam-language television shows
Indian music television series